Pure Country is a 1992 film starring George Strait.

Pure Country may also refer to:

 Pure Country (soundtrack), a soundtrack album from the film, by George Strait
 Pure Country (radio network), a Canadian radio network
 PureCountry, a radio station operated by the Australian Radio Network